Elda Tattoli (1929–2005) was an Italian actress and film director.

Selected filmography
 Hercules Unchained (1959)
 The Warrior Empress (1960)
 China is Near (1967)
 Love and Anger (1969)

References

Bibliography
 Sloan, Jane. Reel Women: An International Directory of Contemporary Feature Films about Women. Scarecrow Press, 2007.

External links

1929 births
2005 deaths
Italian stage actresses
Italian film actresses
Italian film directors
Italian women film directors
Film people from Bologna